NITTE, officially NITTE (Deemed to be University), is an institute of higher education located in Derlakatte, Mangalore, India. It is formed under the Trust of NITTE, a trust sponsored by Nitte Education Trust which has established 31 institutions spread in three campuses at Nitte, Mangalore and Bangalore.

The Government of India conferred the status of Deemed-to-be University in June 2008.

The institution has been accredited with 'A' grade by the National Assessment & Accreditation Council (NAAC).

Academics
The A.B. Shetty Memorial Institute of Dental Sciences (established in 1985) was the first constituent college of Nitte University.

Today, it has five constituent colleges, the other four being K.S. Hegde Medical Academy (established in 1999), N.G.S.M. Institute of Pharmaceutical Sciences (established in 1983), Nitte Usha Institute of Nursing Sciences (established in 1992), and Nitte Institute of Physiotherapy (established in 1997).

K.S. Hegde Medical Academy (KSHEMA) became a constituent of Nitte University in 2009.

Recently it has three more constitute colleges namely Nitte Institute of Communication (2012), Nitte Institute of Architecture (2015) and Nitte Mahalinga Adyanthaya Memorial Institute of Technology (2022).

Rankings

NITTE was ranked 74 among universities in India by the National Institutional Ranking Framework (NIRF) in 2020 and in the 101–150 band overall.

References 

Universities in Mangalore
Deemed universities in Karnataka
Educational institutions established in 2008
2008 establishments in Karnataka